Richard Healey may refer to:
 Richard Healey (luger)
 Rich Healey, Canadian ice hockey
 Dick Healey, New South Wales politician
 Dick Healey (footballer)